Tresa M. Pollock is ALCOA Distinguished Professor of Materials at the Department of Materials, University of California, Santa Barbara. Pollock is internationally recognised in the development of new materials systems, including alloys, 3D characterisation of structure and properties, and development of integrated computation materials engineering.

Pollock was elected a member of the US National Academy of Engineering in 2005 for contributions to our understanding of the processing and performance of advanced metallic materials. She is also a fellow of the Materials, Minerals and Mining Society.

Education 
Pollock grew up in Ohio, near the Wright Patterson Air Force Base and was inspired to study Engineering by the experimental high tech aircraft at the base, as well as Amelia Earhart. This motivated her to enroll at Purdue University as a first generation college student. During her studies, Pollock was a co-op student with Allison Gas Turbine (now Rolls-Royce) in Indianapolis. She completed her Bachelor of Science in Metallurgical Engineering in 1984. For her doctoral studies, she worked with Ali S. Argon at the Massachusetts Institute of Technology and completed her PhD in Materials Science in 1989.

Research and career 
After her studies, Pollock worked at General Electric Aircraft Engines as a Materials Research Engineer from 1989 to 1991 and developed high temperature alloys for aircraft turbine engines. In 1991, she moved to Carnegie Mellon University as a Professor. During this time, she was also a Guest Scientist at General Electric. In 2000, Pollock moved to University of Michigan and took up the L.H and F.E. Van Vlack Professorship in Materials Science and Engineering. In 2010, Pollock moved to University of California, Santa Barbara where she presently works as a Distinguished Professor of Materials and the Alcoa Chair. At the University of California at Santa Barbara, Pollock Directs the Microscopy and Microanalysis Facility. Pollock is a pioneer in the use of femtosecond lasers for 3D tomography of materials. Pollock also acts as Chair of the Scientific Advisory Board for MAPP (a UK consortium for advanced materials processing).

Awards and recognition 
1992 Young Investigator Award, National Science Foundation

1995 ASM Bradley Stoughton Award

1997 Outstanding Materials Engineering, Purdue University, USA

1997-2015 Associate Editor, Metallurgical and Materials Transactions Journals

1999 ASM Silver Medal Research Award

2005 Member, Chinese Academy of Sciences

2005 Lee Husn Award, Chinese Academy of Sciences

2005 TSM Magnesium Technology Award

2005 Member, US-National Academy of Engineering

2005-2006 President of the Minerals, Metals and Materials Society.

2007 ASM Jeffries Lecture

2009 AIME Raymond Award

2005 Elected to the U.S. National Academy of Engineering

2009 Fellow of TMS and ASM International

2011 TMS Structural Materials Distinguished Service Award

2012 ASM International Gold Medal

2013 TMS-ASM Joint Distinguished Lectureship in Materials and Society

2015 Acta Materialia Holloman Award in Materials and Society

2015 Member, German National Academy of Sciences Leopoldina

2016 Principal Editor of Metallurgical and Materials Transactions

2018 Morris Cohen Award

2018 AIME Honorary membership

2018 Alexander Scott Distinguished Service Award

2019 AIME Champion H. Mathewson Award

2021 Institute of Metals/Robert Franklin Mehl Award

References 

Living people
Year of birth missing (living people)
University of California, Santa Barbara faculty
MIT School of Engineering alumni
Purdue University College of Engineering alumni
American materials scientists
Fellows of the Minerals, Metals & Materials Society